Ņikita Koļesņikovs (born October 30, 1992) is a Latvian professional ice hockey player, currently playing for HK Dinaburga of the Latvian Hockey Higher League (LHL).

Playing career
Koļesņikovs began his career in Latvian junior teams he played in Dinamo Riga system with HK Riga as well.

In 2012 he joined Banská Bystrica of Slovak Extraliga. In 2013 he continued his career with Odense Bulldogs of AL-Bank Ligaen in Denmark, where he plays currently.

In January 2016, Kolesnikovs signed for the Edinburgh Capitals. Then, in July 2016, Kolesnikovs signed for Kongsvinger Knights of Norway's GET-ligaen. However, he quickly moved on to Canadian side Saint-Georges Cool FM 103.5 spending just over a season in North America before returning to Edinburgh to re-join the Capitals in November 2017.

Since leaving Edinburgh for a second time, Kolesnikovs has briefly played in Poland, Australia, Latvia, the United States and Ukraine.

International
Koļesņikovs represented Latvia at junior level in 2012 world championships.

References

External links 
 

1992 births
Living people
Sportspeople from Jelgava
Latvian ice hockey defencemen
HK Riga players
Odense Bulldogs players
Edinburgh Capitals players
Västerviks IK players
Dunaújvárosi Acélbikák players
HC Donbass players
SHC Fassa players
Stjernen Hockey players
Shawinigan Cataractes players
Blainville-Boisbriand Armada players
Saint-Georges Cool FM 103.5 players
MKS Cracovia (ice hockey) players
Melbourne Mustangs players
Roanoke Rail Yard Dawgs players
HK Zemgale players
Expatriate ice hockey players in Australia
Latvian expatriate sportspeople in Australia
Expatriate ice hockey players in Scotland
Latvian expatriate sportspeople in Scotland
Expatriate ice hockey players in Poland
Latvian expatriate sportspeople in Poland
Expatriate ice hockey players in Canada
Latvian expatriate sportspeople in Canada
Expatriate ice hockey players in Slovenia
Latvian expatriate sportspeople in Slovenia
Expatriate ice hockey players in Italy
Latvian expatriate sportspeople in Italy
Expatriate ice hockey players in Sweden
Latvian expatriate sportspeople in Sweden
Expatriate ice hockey players in Hungary
Latvian expatriate sportspeople in Hungary
Expatriate ice hockey players in Norway
Latvian expatriate sportspeople in Norway
Expatriate ice hockey players in the United States
Latvian expatriate sportspeople in the United States
Expatriate ice hockey players in Denmark
Latvian expatriate sportspeople in Denmark
Expatriate ice hockey players in Ukraine
Latvian expatriate sportspeople in Ukraine
Latvian expatriate ice hockey people